Clube Esportivo União, more commonly referred to as União Beltrão, is a Brazilian professional association football club in Francisco Beltrão, Paraná which currently plays in Campeonato Paranaense, the top division of the Paraná state football league.

Achievements
 Campeonato Paranaense Second Division:
 Winners (1): 1979
 Campeonato Paranaense Third Division:
 Winners (1): 2016

References

Association football clubs established in 1956
1956 establishments in Brazil
Football clubs in Paraná (state)